The Acer beTouch E130 is a smartphone manufactured by Acer Inc. using the Android 1.6 (Donut) operating system at launch and Android 2.1 in later releases and is designed for a professional use. It has a QWERTY keyboard. It was unveiled in June 2010 and available for sale from August 2010.

Software
The beTouch E130 runs the Android operating system 1.6 (Donut). Several applications that come installed on this device are:
 Gmail
 Google Talk
 Google Maps
 Google Talk
 Google Street View
 YouTube video player
The device comes equipped with Acer Spinlet's application for listening to music in streaming and preinstalled Facebook and Twidroid.

Hardware
 Display: LCD 2.6” QVGA touchscreen
 CPU: ST-Ericsson PNX6715, 416 MHz
 Keyboard: QWERTY
 OS: Android 1.6 (Donut) or Android 2.1
 Camera: 3.2 megapixel
 Connectivity: Wi-Fi (802.11b/g), Bluetooth 2.0+EDR, GPS built A-GPS, AGPS support, FM receiver, 3.5mm stereo audio jack
 Colors: black, white, a rare purple version debuted in October 2010
 Dimensions = 115 x 62.5 x 11.5 mm
 Weight = 109 g

Reception
Reviews from newspapers and blogs underline its similarity to BlackBerry.

See also
 Galaxy Nexus
 List of Android devices

References

External links

Acer beTouch E130 video

beTouch E130
Android (operating system) devices
Mobile phones introduced in 2010